The Bettiah Christians, (transliteration: Béttiah Masīhī), also known as Betiawi Christians, are the northern Indian subcontinent's oldest Christian community, which emerged in the 18th century. Upper-caste Hindus and Muslims who converted to Christianity in the 18th and 19th centuries constitute the majority of the Indo-Aryan ethnoreligious community of Bettiah Christians. The origins of the Bettiah Christian community lie in Champaran, in which the king of the Bettiah Raj in India, Maharaja Dhurup Singh, invited Roman Catholic missionaries of the Order of Friars Minor Capuchin to establish the Bettiah Christian Mission there.

Bettiah Christians are known for working in education, serving as teachers and professors. A number of them have served in ecclesiastical positions as bishops, nuns, brothers and priests.

History 

The Bettiah Raj in India was established by Ugrasen Singh, a Bhumihar ruler who established the state in India in the early 17th century A.D. His son, Gaja Singh, was declared a Raja by the Mughal Indian emperor Shah Jahan. 

In 1713, Christian missionaries of the Order of Friars Minor Capuchin established a hospice in Patna, India. Maharaja Dhurup Singh, the ruler of the Bettiah Raj, developed a close friendship with Italian Capuchin missionary priest Joseph Mary Bernini, who practiced medicine and faith healing, as well as being fluent in Hindustani and Sanskrit. The queen of Maharaja Dhurup Singh, was ill and Joseph Mary Bernini came to their Bettiah Palace to pray for her and treat her; the queen was cured of her "incurable illness" and as a result, Singh invited Bernini to found the Bettiah Christian Mission. To secure Bernini's presence at the Bettiah Fort, Maharaja Dhurup Naryan Singh wrote to Pope Benedict XIV asking that priests be sent to Bettiah and on 1 May 1742, Pope Benedict XIV replied stating that the Capuchin priests could remain there and preach the Gospel. Raja Dhurup Singh donated 16 hectares of land, which became known as the Christian Quarters, to the Roman Catholic missionaries of the Capuchin Order.

In 1749, Joseph Mary Bernini was transferred to Chandannagar to minister to European Christians but he became "sickened at heart with the loose morals of the settlers in the colonial [French] settlement" and wished to be transferred to a location "where there were no Europeans." As such, he returned to his "beloved Bettiah" and Raja Dhurup Singh provided Bernini and his fellow priests the wood to erect a church there. At the dedication of the church in 1751 on Christmas Day, copies of a book describing the friendly relations between Hindus and Christians were brought out, with special copies being printed for the king and other distinguished members of his court. During this event at which most of the citizens of Bettiah were present, Raja Dhurup Singh participated and provided musicians who played outside the church compound.

The German missionary, scientist and geographer Joseph Tiefenthaler wrote in his account on Hindustan that within the walled city of Bettiah, also known as the Bettiah Fort, was a Hindu mandir and the convent of the missionaries of the Franciscan Order.

On 15 January 1761, Joseph Mary Bernini, who had stayed at the Bettiah Christian Mission for the remainder of his life, died and his body was said to produce the odour of sanctity. In the same year, the Bettiah Fort, along with the Bettiah Christian Mission, was attacked by Mir Qasim Ali Khan, the Nawab of Bengal.

In 1766, Bettiah was attacked by the British under Sir Robert Barker, who damaged the fort and the Catholic church there. The East India Company generally viewed the Italian Capuchins with suspicion and in the 1760s, harassed and imprisoned them for several months; that being said, some individual Englishmen were fond of the Bettiah Christians and financially supported them, and "extended Government help for the care of orphans." Raja Jugal Kishore Singh, the ruler of the Bettiah Raj in India refused to accept British rule in his state, fought the British with his army though they ended up retreating to Bundelkhand. Following this, the British appointed an estate manager to govern the East India Company. Lacking the local expertise to govern Bettiah, the East India Company invited Raja Jugal Kishore Singh in 1771 to rule the region under the auspices of the East India Company. 

The Government of the East India Company honoured Raja Dhurup Singh, in 1786, gave the Bettiah Christian Mission 60 bighas of land within the fort, 200 bighas of land outside the fort, along with the village of Chuhari. At that time, there were three Catholic Christian churches in each of these places, with 2500 Christians residing in Bettiah itself, along with 700 Christians residing in Chuhari and 400 Christians residing in Dossaiya.

During the Indian Rebellion of 1857, the Maharaja of Bettiah sided with the British government and in 1909 through the Court of Wards, the Bettiah Raj came under control of the British Raj in India.

Traditional occupations 

At the time of their conversion to Christianity, the Bettiah Christians were largely upper-caste Hindus and Muslims who were scholars, cultivators and farmers, as well as artisans involved in carpentry, goldsmithery, masonry, and blacksmithery. The Brahmins, however, gave up their priestly work.

The majority of Bettiah Christians became involved in the education sector, serving as teachers and professors. Among the first schools opened by the Bettiah Christian Mission included St. Stanislaus Mission Middle English School in 1860, along with St. Aloysius Pathsala and Jubilee Memorial Nursery School; these have produced hundreds of graduates. Khrist Raja High School, established in 1922, has been widely attended by members of the Bettiah Christian Indian community too. Female education was a priority of the Bettiah Christian Mission, with St. Teresa's Mission Middle English School being founded in 1922, along with St. Teresa's Teacher Training College in 1928. As of 1995, there are twenty-seven schools in Bettiah managed by the Bettiah Christian community. While the literacy rate of Bettiah in general was 52.8% in 1991, among the Bettiah Christian community, it stood at 70.09%.

Clothing 

The lehenga, a garment worn by women in northwestern India, was the traditional dress worn by Bettiah Christian women. Since the 1950s, Bettiah Christian women are indistinguishable in dress from their neighbours, wearing the saree and shalwar qameez.

During weddings, men usually don Western-style suits.

Castes 

The majority of Bettiah Christians are upper-caste converts from Hinduism and Islam; they are composed of individuals with the following castes:
Brahmin
Bhumihar
Rajput
Kayasth
Bania
Lohar
Hazam
Mahto
Koeri
Kumhar
Raut

In the Christian Quarters of Bettiah, historically, sonars (goldsmiths) resided in Sonar Patt, lohars (blacksmiths) resided in Lohar Patt, Kayasths (accountants) resided in Kayasth Patt, barhais (carpenters) resided in Barhai Patt, etc. In 1790, the Bettiah Christians in a historic caste panchayat voted to abolish "caste jati norms for marriage and dining." Due to their patronage by the Bettiah Rajas and the zamindari position of the Bettiah Christian Mission authorities, the Bettiah Christian converts mixed freely with Hindus and Muslims, "without any discrimination". Due to the "inter-community marriages and participation in shared community activities sch as life-cycle rituals, festivals, ceremonies, [and] social functions", the Bettiah Christians "oriented to the ideal of a casteless community".
Today, the Bettiah Christians stress a "brotherhood in religion" over caste, forming amicable relationships with Christians of other communities, including Dalit Christians.

Marriage 
With regard to marriage, the Bettiah Christians are generally strict as they are a high-caste community.

During weddings, at the conclusion of the Nuptial Mass, the groom applies sindoor to the parting in his bride's hair.

Ecclesiastical life 
The first Roman Catholic priest from the Bettiah Christian community was ordained in 1861. As of 1995, two bishops of the Catholic Church from the Bettiah Christian community have been ordained.

The Sisters of the Sacred Heart was founded in Bettiah in 1926, with the religious order focusing on service in villages; it has established several schools.

Interfaith relations 

The tradition of communal harmony between the Bettiah Christians and other religious communities has been maintained since the dedication of the first Catholic Christian church in Bettiah:

Since their inception, the Bettiah Christians have maintained a spirit of communal harmony with Hindus and Muslims. Adherents of other faiths often visit the churches of the Bettiah Christians and pray there, especially at the grotto containing a statue of Mother Mary.

Bettiah Christian diaspora 
Educational opportunities fueled the migration of some Bettiah Christians to other urban centres of northern colonial India. The Cornelius family was among the first Bettiah Christian migrants to the city of Kanpur. Some Bettiah Christians are now settled abroad in the United Kingdom, United States, Australia and Canada.

See also 
Punjabi Christians

References 

Christianity in Bihar
Christian communities of India
Christian communities of Pakistan